The men's freestyle javelin throw was one of six throwing events on the Athletics at the 1908 Summer Olympics programme in London. The javelin could be held anywhere, as opposed to the standard javelin throw which required the javelin to be held by a grip in the middle. This was the only time such a "freestyle" event was held at the Olympics. The competition was held on 15 July 1908. 33 throwers from nine nations competed. NOCs could enter up to 12 athletes.

Results

Eric Lemming set a new world and Olympic record with 54.44 metres. He threw the javelin in a conventional manner.

References

Sources
 Official Report of the Games of the IV Olympiad (1908).
 De Wael, Herman. Herman's Full Olympians: "Athletics 1908". Accessed 7 April 2006.

Athletics at the 1908 Summer Olympics
Javelin throw at the Olympics